El-Kentour (الكنتور) is a town and mountain in Algeria. It is located in the Constantine Mountains. El-Kentour is also the site of the El-Ouahch to El-Kentour tunnel, which is part of the National Road 3.

Location
El-Kentour is situated 3 km south of Aïn Bouziane and 4½ km north of Zighoud Youcef. The topography is mountainous, with the Oued Ensa river flowing to the east. The boundary between Skikda and Constantine Province runs through the village.

History
In Roman and Vandal times the town was known as Centuriones.

Bishopric
The town was the seat of an ancient Bishopric and was from the 4th to the 6th century a stronghold of Donatism. The Bishopric remains today a titular see of the Catholic Church, and the current bishop is Vasyl Tuchapets. Known bishops include: 
 Titular bishops
 Vasyl Volodymyr Tuchapets since 2012, Ukrainian Catholic Archiepiscopal Exarch of Kharkiv
  (2005–2012), auxiliary bishop of Lingayen–Dagupan, Philippines
 Kiro Stojanov (1999–2005), auxiliary bishop of Skopje
  (1964–1998), auxiliary bishop of the Military Ordinariate of Brazil (1964–1967), auxiliary bishop of São Sebastião do Rio de Janeiro (1967–1973)
 Residing bishops
 Firmianus Catholic bishop fl.484.
 Ianuarius Donatist bishop fl411.
 Nabor of Centurio, attendee of Council of Cirta fl303-305.

References

Populated places in Skikda Province
Populated places in Constantine Province
Catholic titular sees in Africa
Dioceses established in the 1st century